Eyes absent homolog 1 is a protein that in humans is encoded by the EYA1 gene.

This gene encodes a member of the eyes absent (EYA) subfamily of proteins. The encoded protein may play a role in the developing kidney, branchial arches, eye, and ear. Mutations of this gene have been associated with branchiootorenal dysplasia syndrome, branchiootic syndrome, and sporadic cases of congenital cataracts and ocular anterior segment anomalies. A similar protein in mice can act as a transcriptional activator. Four transcript variants encoding three distinct isoforms have been identified for this gene.

Interactions
EYA1 has been shown to interact with SIX1.

References

Further reading